This is a list of Superfund sites in West Virginia designated under the Comprehensive Environmental Response, Compensation, and Liability Act (CERCLA) environmental law.  The CERCLA federal law of 1980 authorized the United States Environmental Protection Agency (EPA) to create a list of polluted locations requiring a long-term response to clean up hazardous material contamination.   These locations are known as Superfund sites, and are placed on the National Priorities List (NPL).

The NPL guides the Environmental Protection Agency in "determining which sites warrant further investigation" for environmental remediation.  As of October 4, 2022, there were 11 Superfund sites on the National Priorities List in West Virginia.  No additional sites are currently proposed for entry on the list.  Three sites have been cleaned up and removed from the list.

Superfund sites

See also
List of Superfund sites in the United States
List of environmental issues
List of waste types
TOXMAP

External links
EPA list of proposed Superfund sites in West Virginia
EPA list of current Superfund sites in West Virginia
EPA list of Superfund site construction completions in West Virginia
EPA list of partially deleted Superfund sites in West Virginia
EPA list of deleted Superfund sites in West Virginia

References

West Virginia

Superfund